KHQT (103.1 FM, "Hot 103") is a radio station in Las Cruces, New Mexico. It broadcasts a Rhythmic Top 40 format for that area. It is owned by Adams Radio of Las Cruces, LLC, a subsidiary of Adams Radio Group.  Its studios are located in Las Cruces and its transmitter is located north of the city.

External links
KHQT official website
Adams Radio Group Website

Rhythmic contemporary radio stations in the United States
Contemporary hit radio stations in the United States
HQT
Radio stations established in 1984